The 2022 Spain Sevens was held as two rugby sevens tournaments on consecutive weekends in January that year. The first was hosted at Estadio Ciudad in Málaga and the second  at Estadio La Cartuja in Seville. These events were the inaugural season of the Spain Sevens and were played as the third and fourth tournaments of the 2021–22 World Rugby Sevens Series.

South Africa won back-to-back titles in Spain, defeating Argentina in the final at Málaga  and Australia in the final at Seville.

Format
The teams at each tournament were drawn into four pools. A round-robin was held for each pool, where each team played the others in their pool once. The top two teams from each pool advanced to the Cup quarterfinals to compete for tournament honours. The other teams from each pool went to the lower classification playoffs.

Teams 
The fifteen national men's teams competing in Spain were:

 
 
 
 
 
 
 
 
 
 
 
 
 
 
 

Due to impacts of the COVID-19 pandemic, several core teams originally scheduled to play had to be replaced in the draw before the competition began.

 New Zealand was eligible to play in Málaga and Seville but withdrew due to the challenges of COVID-19 travel logistics. Germany replaced them for both tournaments.

 Fiji and Samoa withdrew from both events in Spain following positive COVID-19 tests in their respective squads. Jamaica replaced Samoa in Málaga and then replaced Fiji in Seville.

Fiji and Samoa were not replaced in the schedules for Málaga and Seville, respectively. Their opponents advanced by walkover in those tournaments. As such, Fiji finished equal-last in Málaga and received one point toward their season standings. Samoa finished equal-last in Seville and received one point toward their season standings.

Pool stage – Málaga
The first tournament was held at Estadio Ciudad in Málaga on 21–23 January 2022. South Africa won the event, defeating Argentina in the final by 24–17.

All times in Central European Time (GMT+01:00). The pools were scheduled as follows:

Key:  Team advanced to the quarterfinals

Pool A – Málaga
Fiji was included in the draw but did not compete in the tournament so there were only three teams in Pool A. Fiji's matches were scored as  byes and their opponents gained 3 points in the pool standings for each bye.

Pool B – Málaga

Pool C – Málaga

Pool D – Málaga

Knockout stage – Málaga

13th-place playoffs – Málaga
Jamaica had a bye through to the 13th-place final due to Fiji's withdrawal from the tournament.

9th-place playoffs – Málaga
Wales had a bye through to the 9th-place semifinals due to Fiji's withdrawal from the tournament.

5th-place playoffs – Málaga

Cup playoffs – Málaga

Placings – Málaga
Fiji was a late withdrawal from the tournament but was not replaced in the draw. As such, despite not competing, Fiji finished equal-last in Málaga and received one point toward their season standings.

Source: World Rugby

Pool stage – Seville
The second tournament was held at Estadio La Cartuja in Seville on 28–30 January 2022. South Africa won the event, defeating Australia in the final by 33–7.

All times in Central European Time (GMT+01:00). The pools were scheduled as follows:

Key:  Team advanced to the quarterfinals

Pool A – Seville
Samoa was included in the draw but did not compete in the tournament so there were only three teams in Pool A. Samoa's matches were scored as  byes and their opponents gained 3 points in the pool standings for each bye.

Pool B – Seville

Pool C – Seville

Pool D – Seville

Knockout stage – Seville

13th-place playoffs – Seville
Wales had a bye through to the 13th-place final due to Samoa's withdrawal from the tournament.

9th-place playoffs – Seville
Kenya had a bye through to the 9th-place semifinals due to Samoa's withdrawal from the tournament.

5th-place playoffs – Seville

Cup playoffs – Seville

Placings – Seville
Samoa was a late withdrawal from the tournament but was not replaced in the draw. As such, despite not competing, Samoa finished equal-last in Seville and received one point toward their season standings.

Source: World Rugby

See also
 2022 Spain Women's Sevens

References

External links 
 Tournament site
 World Rugby info: Málaga
 World Rugby info: Seville

2022
2021–22 World Rugby Sevens Series
2022 in Spanish sport
2021–22 in European rugby union
2021–22 in Spanish rugby union
Spain Sevens